Sweet Murder are an English heavy metal band formed in Birmingham, England, in 2013. The band was originally called Methodemic and under that name put out their debut EP Aftermath which was released to critical acclaim in October 2013. In 2014 lead singer and founding member Andy Dyer Jr left the band and was replaced by Emily Levy. In 2016 Dyer returned and the band changed its name to Sweet Murder.

History

Formation and debut EP (2013)
The band was founded in May 2013 by Andy Dyer, Reece Lloyd, and Declan Moore shortly after the breakup of the band Exide, in which Andy Dyer and Reece Lloyd both played. The initial idea to put the band together came from the former Exide manager Andy "Bear" Warner. It was originally intended to be a second re-formation of Exide, but after auditions were held and Dec Moore became the second guitarist, the band decided that with slightly altered spelling they should be called Methodemic after the last track of the Black Sabbath album 13.

By August 2013 bassist Andy "Butter" Morris and drummer Nathan Hellier-Allport had joined the band and the lineup was complete.

The band went into the studio in September 2013 to record their debut EP, Aftermath, which was released on 10 October 2013. The band held an official launch party for the release at the 02 Academy in Birmingham on 10 October 2013.

Second EP 2014–2015
In 2014 the band began work on their debut album initially titled Liberty Or Death which was meant to be released in late 2014.

In January 2014 the band parted ways with guitarist Reece Lloyd for what the band described as "Musical and personal differences".

The band stated that their intention was to continue as a four-piece.

On 4 May 2014 the band announced via their website that Daniel Riley was their new rhythm guitarist and would be joining the band on a full-time basis.

In June 2014 after three weeks as a member the band parted ways with Riley; the band have yet to reveal their reasons and have stated on their website that they won't be going into any details.

On 1 July 2014 the band announced via their Facebook and official website that the studio had been booked for November, that work on the follow-up to Aftermath was 90% done and the band was almost ready to record.

They also announced that a cover of a pop song they had adapted to sound metal would be included on the album.

On 1 November 2014, two days before the band was going into the studio to record their next EP, Andy Dyer Jr quit the band due to complications in the band.

On 30 November 2014 Methodemic gained a new singer, Emily Levy.

In 2015 the band released a self-titled four-track EP.

The band opened for the Norwegian metal band Hydra on their Northern Symphony festival pre show in Dudley.

Return of Andy Dyer and name change
In early 2016 Dyer and Moore discussed the possibility of working together again as Moore was dissatisfied with the direction the band was going. He felt the group was floundering and had drifted away from what had made it special. It was quickly decided that the current members of the band would not be taking part and that Dyer and Moore would reform the group around themselves with new members. It was soon apparent that continuing on under the Methodemic name would be problematic, so the band chose to use the name "Sweet Murder".

According to the band, work on the long-awaited follow-up to 2013's Aftermath has begun and new music was to be released in 2016. Dyer and Moore's long-time song writing partner Bear is back with the band and working on songs for the new release.

Musical style
The band's music has been described as a mix of traditional heavy metal, speed metal, power metal and hard rock. It has been dubbed "dog metal" by fans because the band's sound is a mixed breed of many different heavy metal styles and subgenres.

Gallery

Members
 Declan Moore – lead guitar, acoustic guitar, backing vocals (May 2013 – present)
 Andy Dyer Jr – lead vocals, backing vocals (May 2013 – November 2014); lead vocals,  keyboards and piano (February 2016 – present)

Other
 Bear – co-songwriter (May 2013 – November 2014, February 2016 – present)

Former members
 Andy "Butter" Morris – bass guitar, keyboards, backing vocals (August 2013 – March 2016)
 Nathanial Hellier-Allport – drums, percussion, backing vocals (July 2013 – January 2016)
 Emily Levy – lead vocals, backing vocals (December 2014 – February 2016)
 Reece Lloyd – rhythm guitar, acoustic guitar (May 2013 – January 2014)
 Daniel Riley – rhythm guitar, acoustic guitar, backing vocals (May–June 2014)
 Mitch Jay Barlow – drums, percussion (December 2015 – March 2016)

Timeline

Discography
 Aftermath (2013)
 Methodemic (2015)
 Sweet Murder (2016)

References

External links
 

English heavy metal musical groups
Musical groups established in 2013
Musical groups from Birmingham, West Midlands
2013 establishments in England